The Granite Mountains are a small mountain range in San Bernardino County, California, USA, located in the Mojave Desert. 
They are in the Mojave National Preserve, in the National Park Service system.

The University of California operates the Granite Mountain Natural Reserve on 9000 acres of land within the Mojave National Preserve. The Granite Mountains Natural Reserve is a research and teaching center that was established by the late Professor Dr. Kenneth Norris of U.C. Santa Cruz in 1978 and is now managed out of UC Riverside. Students and faculty have completed extensive studies of the natural history of the Granite Mountains since the reserve's inception. This is one of 37 reserves in the UC Natural Reserve System.

Geography
The Granite Mountains are north of Interstate 40 and historic Route 66. The Providence Mountains are adjacent to the northeast. The Bristol Mountains are directly to the west, the Old Woman Mountains are to the southeast, and Pisgah Crater and the Bullion Mountains are to the southwest. The Mountains lie east of the small community of Kelso, northeast of Ludlow, and north of Amboy.

The range stretches from Granite Pass to Budweiser Wash.

Geology
Some of the more striking rock formations in the Mojave National Preserve lie in the Granite Mountains. These granitic rocks have eroded into unusual rounded shapes that include spires, perched boulders, and curved cliff faces.

Granitic rocks represent the roots of ancient continental-margin volcanic systems. Most of the granitic rock in the Mojave Desert is late Mesozoic in age (80 to 180 million years old). The granites formed at depth within a volcanically active mountain range comparable in geologic setting to the Andes chain in South America.

The granitoids formed by the slow cooling and solidification of molten magma bodies that developed above sinking slabs of oceanic crust overridden by the edge of the continent. At least 55 or 60 million years elapsed between the crystallization of the last Mesozoic magma bodies and deposition of the youngest-preserved overlying strata.

Several springs exist in the Granite Mountains, though they may not flow year round.

See also
Camp Granite World War 2 training camp

References 

 America's Volcanic Past - Mojave National Preserve (USGS PD source)

Mojave National Preserve
Mountain ranges of the Mojave Desert
Protected areas of the Mojave Desert
Mountain ranges of San Bernardino County, California
Protected areas of San Bernardino County, California